Stade Olympique de Chamonix is an equestrian stadium in Chamonix, France.  It hosted the opening and closing ceremonies to the 1924 Winter Olympics along with cross-country skiing, curling, figure skating, ice hockey, military patrol, the cross-country skiing part of the Nordic combined, and the speed skating events.  The stadium holds 45,000.

References
1924 Olympics official report. pp. 645, 648–50. 

Venues of the 1924 Winter Olympics
Sports venues in Haute-Savoie
Olympic biathlon venues
Olympic cross-country skiing venues
Olympic figure skating venues
Olympic ice hockey venues
Olympic Nordic combined venues
Olympic speed skating venues
Olympic curling venues
Curling venues in France
Olympic stadiums
Sports venues completed in 1923
1923 establishments in France